Actinokineospora iranica is a Gram-positive and strictly aerobic bacterium from the genus Actinokineospora which has been isolated from soil from hypersaline wetland from Inche-Broun, Golestan Province, Iran.

References

Pseudonocardiales
Bacteria described in 2014